Nezhukhiv  – village (selo), which is located in Stryi Raion, Lviv Oblast, of Western Ukraine. It belongs to Stryi urban hromada, one of the hromadas of Ukraine. 

Local government — Nezhukhivska village council.  

The first written mention dates back to year 1456.

Famous people 
 Michael Datsyshyn (November 20, 1914 - December 14, 1993) – village pastor Ukrainian Greek Catholic Church from 1945 to 1954.

Gallery

References

External links 
 Geographical Names, Nezhukhiv: Ukraine
 weather.in.ua

Villages in Stryi Raion